Sir William Jack Skate  (26 September 1953 – 3 January 2006) was a prominent Papua New Guinea politician. He was the son of an Australian father and a Papua New Guinean mother. Though his career was turbulent and often marked by setbacks, he served in the highest posts in his country: prime minister of Papua New Guinea, speaker of the National Parliament, and as acting governor-general of Papua New Guinea.

Life 
Skate became manager of the capital district commission in 1987. He was elected to parliament in 1992 and served as speaker from 1992 to 1994, supporting the government of Paias Wingti.

Skate served as governor of the National Capital District from 1995 to 1997. He was prime minister from 1997 to 1999 and resigned after 18 months, fearing that he would lose a challenge. In 2002, his political party the People's National Congress Party (PNC) became a coalition partner in the government of Michael Somare and Skate became Speaker of the National Parliament. He was appointed acting governor-general in November 2003, a constitutional requirement when that office falls vacant. Pato Kakeraya was scheduled to take up the office on 20 January 2004, but Skate continued to act in the office because of court challenges to Kakeraya's election.

On 3 March 2004, Skate was suspended as acting governor-general because of allegations that he misappropriated funds during the 1990s. He then advised the Prime Minister to appoint a cabinet minister as acting governor-general. The following day, however, he was cleared of the financial charges in court, and he became acting governor-general again. In May 2004, his party left the coalition when he and other members refused to support a constitutional amendment supported by Somare which would have given the government more time to be immune to no-confidence votes. As a result, the PNC became the largest opposition party.

On 28 May 2004, Skate ceased to be Speaker when the parliament elected a pro-government candidate, Jeffery Nape. The office of governor-general was still vacant at that stage, so Nape automatically succeeded Skate as acting governor-general.

Bill Skate was knighted in January 2005 for services to parliament, becoming Sir William Skate.

He died in hospital on 3 January 2006, in Brisbane, Australia, where he had been airlifted after suffering a stroke in late December 2005 which was probably an effect of chronic alcoholism. He was buried in Port Moresby.

See also

References

External links 
 Pacific Magazine: Former Prime Minister Sir William Skate Dies At 52
 Pacific Magazine: Former PM Sir Bill Skate Laid To Rest
 Pacific Magazine: Public Holiday Declared For Sir Skate’s Funeral
 Pacific Magazine: Sir Bill Skate Ailing, Medivacked To Queensland Hospital

Papua New Guinean people of English descent
1953 births
2006 deaths
Governors-General of Papua New Guinea
Members of the National Parliament of Papua New Guinea
Leaders of political parties in Papua New Guinea
Prime Ministers of Papua New Guinea
Speakers of the National Parliament of Papua New Guinea
Knights Commander of the Order of St Michael and St George
Politicians awarded knighthoods
People's National Congress (Papua New Guinea) politicians
Papua New Guinean people of Australian descent